Kenneth Kaunda International Airport  is an international airport located in Chongwe District, off the Great East Road, approximately  northeast of the city centre of Lusaka, the capital and largest city of Zambia.  The airport has a capacity of 6 million and is the largest in Zambia, serving as a hub for its region. The airport serves as a hub for Zambia Airways, Proflight Zambia, Royal Zambian Airlines, and Mahogany Air.

The airport opened in 1967 as Lusaka International Airport. It was renamed in 2011 in honour of Kenneth Kaunda, the nation's first president.

History 
In May 2012, KLM began operating a flight three times a week between Amsterdam and Lusaka using an Airbus A330-200. The flight was restructured later that year to also serve Harare. In October 2014, KLM stopped operating the flight in favour of offering codeshare flights operated by Kenya Airways from Nairobi.

In 2015, the government of Zambia began a three-year, US$360 million expansion and improvement of the airport, with funds borrowed from the Exim Bank of China. The work, contracted to China Jiangxi International, involves construction of a new  "two-story terminal building, 22 check-in counters, 12 border channels and six security check counters; a presidential terminal, a new air traffic control building and tower and a new hotel". The new terminal was expected to open in 2019.  Construction was substantially complete by late January 2020. The new terminal was officially opened 5 August 2021. All international flights use the new terminal, called Terminal Two, while domestic flights use the original terminal, Terminal One.

Facilities

Terminals 
Kenneth Kaunda International Airport has two terminals. Terminal One has no jet bridges and is used for domestic traffic. Terminal Two, opened in August 2021, has six gates and handles all international flights.

Ground transportation 
Taxis are the most common form of transport to and from the city, as it is a 15 to 20-minute ride to the city centre. There are also 2 car rental companies at the airport, Avis and Europcar, but most hotels in Lusaka have shuttle services into the airport. A bus line also goes between the airport and the Chelston bus station, but the busses do not run on a regular schedule.

Airlines and destinations

Passenger

Notes
 This flight operates via Harare. However, the carrier does not have rights to transport passengers solely between Lusaka and Harare.
 This flight operates via Harare. However, the carrier does not have rights to transport passengers solely between Lusaka and Harare.
 This flight operates via Dar es Salaam. However, the carrier does not have rights to transport passengers solely between Lusaka and Dar es Salaam.

Cargo

Accidents and incidents 

 On 26 August 1969, a Zambian Air Force Hawker Siddeley HS-748 lost control and crashed during takeoff. Three of the four occupants died.
On 22 December 1974, a Canadair CL-44D4 operated by Tradewinds Airways caught fire after its nose gear collapsed during a hard landing. The fire was quickly extinguished and all of the occupants survived. 
On 14 May 1977, a Dan-Air Services/IAS Cargo Boeing 707 crashed after the right elevator and horizontal stabilizer separated during approach. The separation was caused by metal fatigue. All six occupants died.
 On 17 February 1990, a Zambian Air Force de Havilland Canada DHC-5D crashed into a field during approach. All 29 people on board died. This crash remains the worst aviation accident in Zambian History

See also
Transport in Zambia
List of airports in Zambia

References

External links
 Kenneth Kaunda International Airport OpenStreetMap
 

Airports in Zambia
Buildings and structures in Lusaka
Airports established in 1967
Lusaka